α,N,N-Trimethyltryptamine (α,N,N-TMT, α-TMT, ATMT) is a psychoactive drug of the tryptamine chemical class which acts as a psychedelic hallucinogen. It is similar in structure to the other psychedelics of the tryptamine class such as dimethyltryptamine (DMT) and α-methyltryptamine (α-MT).

α-TMT has been tested in animals in comparison with α-MT and was found to produce similar effects, but with only around half the potency.

See also 
 AAZ-A-154
 Ciclindole
 MPMI

References 

Psychedelic tryptamines
Dimethylamino compounds